Remember This House is an unfinished manuscript by James Baldwin, a memoir of his personal recollections of civil rights leaders Medgar Evers, Malcolm X and Martin Luther King Jr.

Following Baldwin's 1987 death, publishing company McGraw-Hill sued his estate to recover the $200,000 advance they had paid him for the book, although the lawsuit was dropped by 1990.

The manuscript forms the basis for Raoul Peck's 2016 documentary film I Am Not Your Negro. In February 2017, Vintage International published the book I Am Not Your Negro to accompany the documentary.

References

External links

Books by James Baldwin
Books about race and ethnicity
English-language books
Unpublished books
Non-fiction books adapted into films
Unfinished books